Zhuravlevo is a rural locality (a village) in Yudinskoye Rural Settlement, Velikoustyugsky District, Vologda Oblast, Russia. The population was 47 as of 2002. There are 6 streets.

Geography 
Zhuravlevo is located 5 km northeast of Veliky Ustyug (the district's administrative centre) by road. Energetik is the nearest rural locality.

References 

Rural localities in Velikoustyugsky District